Horsemonger Lane Gaol (also known as the Surrey County Gaol or the New Gaol) was a prison close to present-day Newington Causeway in Southwark, south London. Built at the end of the 18th century, it was in use until 1878.

History

The gaol was built to replace the old county gaol housed at what had been the nearby 'White Lion Inn' on Borough High Street, Southwark (informally called the 'Borough Gaol'). The new building was designed by George Gwilt the Elder, surveyor to the county of Surrey, and completed in 1799. It was adjacent to Sessions House, a court building also designed by Gwilt.

Horsemonger Lane remained Surrey’s principal prison and place of execution up to its closure in 1878. It was a common gaol, housing both debtors and criminals, with a capacity of around 300 inmates. In total, 131 men and four women were executed there between 1800 and 1877, the gallows being erected on the flat roof of the prison's gatehouse.

By 1859, the gaol was no longer known as 'Horsemonger Lane' following the road's change of name to Union Road (today: Harper Road), being renamed Surrey County Gaol (although its alternative name, the New Gaol, should not be confused with the New Prison, located north of the River Thames in Clerkenwell).

The gaol was demolished in 1881 and replaced by a public park, Newington Gardens, which opened in 1884.

Literary connections
In 1849, Charles Dickens attended the public hangings outside the gaol of husband and wife Frederick and Maria Manning, who had killed a friend for his money and buried him under the kitchen floor. Dickens wrote to The Times condemning such public spectacles.

Dickens later based the character of Hortense  in Bleak House on Maria Manning, while Mrs Chivery's tobacco shop in Little Dorrit is located on Horsemonger Lane. Executions at Horsemonger Lane are also mentioned in Sarah Waters' novel Fingersmith.

Inmates
Inmates included:
 William Chester Minor, convicted of murder
 Edward Despard, convicted of high treason (executed at the gaol on 21 February 1803)
 Leigh Hunt, convicted of criticism of the Prince Regent
 Marie and Frederick Manning, convicted of murder (executed at the gaol on 13 November 1849)
 Robert Taylor, convicted of blasphemy
 Arthur Tooth, convicted of contempt of court
 Margaret Waters, convicted of murder (executed at the gaol on 11 October 1870)

See also
Marshalsea

References

External links
London footprints: Crime & Punishment
'The Old Kent Road', Old and New London: Volume 6 (1878), pp. 248–55. URL: http://www.british-history.ac.uk/report.asp?compid=45279. Date accessed: 19 December 2006.
Old Towns of England, London in 1839, Pt 6
Index to deaths, 1798-1878, in Surrey County Gaol

Defunct prisons in London
Former buildings and structures in the London Borough of Southwark
1790s establishments in England
Buildings and structures demolished in 1881
1881 disestablishments in England
Demolished prisons